Tarzan at the Earth's Core is a novel  by American writer Edgar Rice Burroughs, serialized in September 1929 to March 1930, the thirteenth in his series of twenty-four books about the title character Tarzan and the fourth in his series set in the interior world of Pellucidar.

Plot summary
In response to a radio plea from Abner Perry, a scientist who, with his friend David Innes, has discovered the interior world of Pellucidar at the Earth's core, Jason Gridley launches an expedition to rescue Innes from the Korsars (corsairs), the scourge of the internal seas. He enlists Tarzan, and a fabulous airship is constructed to penetrate Pellucidar via the natural polar opening connecting the outer and inner worlds. The airship is crewed primarily by Germans, with Tarzan's Waziri warriors under their chief Muviro also along for the expedition.

In Pellucidar Tarzan and Gridley are each separated from the main force of the expedition and must struggle for survival against the prehistoric creatures and peoples of the inner world. Gridley wins the love of the native cave-woman Jana, the Red Flower of Zoram. Eventually everyone is reunited, and the party succeeds in rescuing Innes.

As Tarzan and the others prepare to return home, Gridley decides to stay to search for Frederich Wilhelm Eric von Mendeldorf and von Horst, one last member of the expedition who remains lost (The missing von Horst's adventures are told in a sequel, Back to the Stone Age, which does not involve either Gridley or Tarzan).

Comic adaptations
The book has been adapted into comic form by Gold Key Comics in Tarzan nos. 179-181, dated November 1969-January 1970, with a script by Gaylord DuBois and art by Doug Wildey.

See also 
 1930 in science fiction

References

Sources

External links
ERBzine.com Illustrated Bibliography entry for Edgar Rice Burroughs' Tarzan at the Earth's Core
 
Free Ebook from Project Gutenberg of Australia
Formatted epub version of the book on edgar-rice-burroughs-ebooks Blog
Edgar Rice Burroughs Summary Project Page for Tarzan at the Earth's Core

1930 American novels
1930 fantasy novels
American fantasy novels
Crossover novels
Tarzan novels by Edgar Rice Burroughs
Pellucidar novels by Edgar Rice Burroughs